In Greek mythology, Oenotrus (Ancient Greek: Οἴνωτρος) was the youngest of fifty sons of Lycaon from Arcadia. Together with his brother Peucetius (Greek: Πευκέτιος), he migrated to the Italian Peninsula, dissatisfied because of the division of Peloponnesus among the fifty brothers by their father Lycaon. According to the Greek and Roman traditions, this was the first expedition dispatched from Greece to found a colony, long before the Trojan War. He was the eponym of Oenotria (Greek: Οἰνωτρία), giving his name to the Italian peninsula, especially the Southern Pass (modern Calabria).

Notes

References 

 Dionysus of Halicarnassus, Roman Antiquities. English translation by Earnest Cary in the Loeb Classical Library, 7 volumes. Harvard University Press, 1937-1950. Online version at Bill Thayer's Web Site
 Dionysius of Halicarnassus, Antiquitatum Romanarum quae supersunt, Vol I-IV. . Karl Jacoby. In Aedibus B.G. Teubneri. Leipzig. 1885. Greek text available at the Perseus Digital Library.
 Pausanias, Description of Greece with an English Translation by W.H.S. Jones, Litt.D., and H.A. Ormerod, M.A., in 4 Volumes. Cambridge, MA, Harvard University Press; London, William Heinemann Ltd. 1918. . Online version at the Perseus Digital Library
 Pausanias, Graeciae Descriptio. 3 vols. Leipzig, Teubner. 1903.  Greek text available at the Perseus Digital Library.

Sons of Lycaon
Princes in Greek mythology
Kings in Greek mythology
Arcadian characters in Greek mythology
Arcadian mythology